In mathematics, Deligne–Lusztig theory is a way of constructing linear representations of finite groups of Lie type using ℓ-adic cohomology with compact support, introduced by .

 used these representations  to find all representations of all finite simple groups of Lie type.

Motivation
Suppose that G is a reductive group defined over a finite field, with Frobenius map F.

This was the main result proved by Pierre Deligne and George Lusztig; they found a virtual representation for all characters of an F-stable maximal torus, which is irreducible (up to sign) when the character is in general position.

When the maximal torus is split, these representations were well known and are given by parabolic induction of characters of the torus (extend the character to a Borel subgroup, then induce it up to G). The representations of parabolic induction can be constructed using functions on a space, which can be thought of as elements of a suitable zeroth cohomology group.  Deligne and Lusztig's construction is a generalization of parabolic induction to non-split tori using higher cohomology groups. (Parabolic induction can also be done with tori of G replaced by Levi subgroups of G, and there is a generalization of Deligne–Lusztig theory to this case too.)

Vladimir Drinfeld proved that the discrete series representations of SL2(Fq) can be found in the  ℓ-adic cohomology groups

of the affine curve X defined by

.

The polynomial  is a determinant used in the construction of the  Dickson invariant of the general linear group, and is an invariant of the special linear group.

The construction of Deligne and Lusztig is a generalization of this fundamental example to other groups. The affine curve X is generalized to a  bundle over a "Deligne–Lusztig variety" where T is a maximal torus of G, and instead of using just the first cohomology group they use an alternating sum of ℓ-adic cohomology groups with compact support to construct virtual representations.

The Deligne-Lusztig construction is formally similar to Hermann Weyl's construction of the representations of a compact group from the characters of a maximal torus. The case of compact groups is easier partly because there is only one conjugacy class of maximal tori. The Borel–Weil–Bott construction of representations of algebraic groups using coherent sheaf cohomology is also similar.

For real semisimple groups there is an analogue of the construction of Deligne and Lusztig, using Zuckerman functors to construct representations.

Deligne–Lusztig varieties
The construction of Deligne-Lusztig characters uses a family of auxiliary algebraic varieties XT called Deligne–Lusztig varieties, constructed from a reductive linear algebraic group G defined over a finite field Fq.

If B is a Borel subgroup of G and T a maximal torus of B then we write

WT,B

for the Weyl group (normalizer mod centralizer)

NG(T)/T

of G with respect to T, together with the simple roots corresponding to B. If B1 is another Borel subgroup with maximal torus T1 then there is a canonical isomorphism from T to  T1 that identifies the two Weyl groups. So we can identify all these Weyl groups, and call it 'the' Weyl group W of G. Similarly there is a canonical isomorphism between any two maximal tori with given choice of positive roots, so we can identify all these and call it 'the' maximal torus T of G.

By the Bruhat decomposition

G = BWB,

the subgroup B1 can be written as the conjugate of B by bw for some b∈B and w∈W (identified with WT,B) where w is uniquely determined. In this case we say that B and B1 are in relative position w.

Suppose that w is in the Weyl group of G, and write X for the smooth projective variety of all Borel subgroups of G.
The Deligne-Lusztig variety X(w) consists of all Borel subgroups B of G such that B and F(B) are in relative position w [recall that F is the Frobenius map]. In other words, it is the  inverse image of the G-homogeneous space of pairs of Borel subgroups in relative position w, under the Lang isogeny with formula

g.F(g)−1.
For example, if w=1 then X(w) is 0-dimensional and its points are the rational Borel subgroups of G.

We let T(w) be the torus T, with the rational structure for which the Frobenius is wF.
The GF conjugacy classes of F-stable maximal tori of G can be identified with the F-conjugacy classes of W, where we say w∈W is F-conjugate to elements of the form vwF(v)−1 for v∈W. If the group G is split, so that F acts trivially on W, this is the same as ordinary conjugacy, but in general for non-split groups G, F may act on W via a non-trivial diagram automorphism. The F-stable conjugacy classes can be identified with elements of the non-abelian Galois cohomology group of torsors

.

Fix a maximal torus T of G and a Borel subgroup B containing it, both invariant under the Frobenius map F, and write U for the unipotent radical of B.
If we choose a representative w′ of the normalizer N(T) representing w, then we define X′(w′) to be the elements of G/U with F(u)=uw′.
This is acted on freely by T(F), and the quotient is isomorphic to X(T). So
for each character θ of T(w)F we get a corresponding local system Fθ on X(w). The
Deligne-Lusztig virtual representation

Rθ(w)

of GF is defined by the alternating sum

of l-adic compactly supported cohomology groups of X(w) with coefficients in the l-adic local system Fθ.

If T is a maximal F-invariant torus of G contained in a Borel subgroup B such that
B and FB are in relative position w then Rθ(w) is also
denoted by RθT⊂B, or by RθT as up to isomorphism it does not depend on the choice of B.

Properties of Deligne–Lusztig characters
 The character of RθT does not depend on the choice of prime l≠p, and if θ=1 its values are rational integers.
 Every irreducible character of GF occurs in at least one character Rθ(w).
 The inner product of RθT and Rθ′T′ is equal to the number of elements of W(T,T′)F taking θ to θ′. The set W(T,T′) is the set of elements of G taking T to T′ under conjugation, modulo the group TF which acts on it in the obvious way (so if T=T′ it is the Weyl group). In particular the inner product is 0 if w and w′ are not F-conjugate. If θ is in general position then RθT has norm 1 and is therefore an irreducible character up to sign. So this verifies Macdonald's conjecture.
 The representation RθT contains the trivial representation if and only if θ=1 (in which case the trivial representation occurs exactly once).
 The representation RθT has dimension

where UF is a Sylow p-subgroup of GF, of order the largest power of p dividing |GF|.
 The restriction of the character RθT to unipotent elements u does not depend on θ and is called a Green function, denoted by QT,G(u) (the Green function is defined to be 0 on elements that are not unipotent). The character formula gives the character of RθT in terms of Green functions of subgroups as follows:

where x=su is the Jordan–Chevalley decomposition of x as the product of commuting semisimple and unipotent elements s and u, and Gs is the identity component of the centralizer of s in G. In particular the character value vanishes unless the semisimple part of x is conjugate under GF to something in the torus T.
 The Deligne-Lusztig variety is usually affine, in particular whenever the characteristic p is larger than the Coxeter number h of the Weyl group. If it is affine and the character θ is in general position (so that the Deligne-Lusztig character is irreducible up to sign) then only one of the cohomology groups Hi(X(w),Fθ) is non-zero (the one with i equal to the length of w) so this cohomology group gives a model for the irreducible representation. In general it is possible for more than one cohomology group to be non-zero, for example when θ is 1.

Lusztig's classification of irreducible characters
Lusztig classified all the irreducible characters of GF by decomposing such a character into a semisimple character and a unipotent character (of another group) and separately classifying the semisimple and unipotent characters.

The dual group
The representations of GF are classified using conjugacy classes of the dual group of G.
A reductive group over a finite field determines a root datum (with choice of Weyl chamber) together with an action of the Frobenius element on it.
The dual group G* of a reductive  algebraic group G defined over a finite field is the one with dual root datum (and adjoint Frobenius action).
This is similar to the Langlands dual group (or L-group), except here the dual group is defined over a finite field rather than over the complex numbers. The dual group has the same root system, except that root systems of type B and C get exchanged.

The local Langlands conjectures state (very roughly) that representations of an algebraic group over a local field should be closely related to conjugacy classes in the Langlands dual group. Lusztig's classification of representations of reductive groups over finite fields can be thought of as a verification of an analogue of this conjecture for finite fields (though Langlands never  stated his conjecture for this case).

Jordan decomposition
In this section G will be a reductive group with connected center.

An irreducible character  is called unipotent if it occurs in some R1T, and is called semisimple if its average value on regular unipotent elements is non-zero (in which case the average value is 1 or −1). If p is a good prime for G (meaning that it does not divide any of the coefficients of roots expressed as linear combinations of simple roots) then an irreducible character is semisimple if and only if its order is not divisible by p.

An arbitrary irreducible character has a "Jordan decomposition": to it one can associate a semisimple character (corresponding to some semisimple element s of the dual group), and a unipotent representation of the centralizer of s. The dimension of the irreducible character is the product of the dimensions of its semisimple and unipotent components.

This (more or less) reduces the classification of irreducible characters to the problem of finding the semisimple and the unipotent characters.

Geometric conjugacy
Two pairs (T,θ), (T′,θ′) of a maximal torus T of G fixed by F and a character θ of TF are called geometrically conjugate if they are conjugate under some element of G(k), where k is the algebraic closure of  Fq. If an irreducible representation occurs in both RTθ and RT′θ′ then (T,θ), (T′,θ′) need not be conjugate under GF, but are always geometrically conjugate. For example, if θ = θ′ = 1 and T and T′ are not conjugate, then the identity representation occurs in both Deligne–Lusztig characters, and the corresponding pairs (T,1), (T′,1) are geometrically conjugate but not conjugate.

The geometric conjugacy classes of pairs (T,θ) are  parameterized by geometric conjugacy classes of semisimple elements s of the group  G*F of elements of the dual group G* fixed by F. Two elements of G*F are called geometrically conjugate if they are conjugate over the algebraic closure of the finite field; if the center of G is connected this is equivalent to conjugacy in G*F. The number of geometric conjugacy classes of pairs (T,θ) is |Z0F|ql where Z0 is the identity component of the center Z of G and l is the semisimple rank of G.

Classification of semisimple characters
In this subsection G will be a reductive group with connected center Z. (The case when the center is not connected has some extra complications.)

The semisimple characters of G correspond to geometric conjugacy classes of pairs (T,θ) (where T is a maximal torus invariant under F and θ is a character of TF); in fact among the irreducible characters occurring in the Deligne–Lusztig characters of a geometric conjugacy class there is exactly one semisimple character. If
the center of G is connected there are |ZF|ql semisimple characters. If κ is a geometric conjugacy class of pairs (T,θ) then the character of the corresponding semisimple representation is given up to sign by

and its dimension is the p′ part of the index of the centralizer of the element s of the dual group corresponding to it.

The semisimple characters are (up to sign) exactly the duals of the regular characters, under Alvis–Curtis duality, a duality operation on generalized characters.
An irreducible character is called regular if it occurs in the Gelfand–Graev representation
It is reducible, and any irreducible character of GF occurs at most once in it. If κ is a geometric conjugacy class of pairs (T,θ) then the character of the corresponding regular representation is given  by

and its dimension is the p′ part of the index of the centralizer of the element s of the dual group corresponding to it times the p-part of the order of the centralizer.

Classification of unipotent characters

These can be found from the cuspidal unipotent characters: those that cannot be obtained from decomposition of parabolically induced characters of smaller rank groups. The unipotent cuspidal characters were listed by Lusztig using rather complicated arguments. The number of them depends only on the type of the group and not on the underlying field; and is given as follows:
 none for groups of type An;
 none for groups of type 2An, unless n = s(s+1)/2–1 for some s, in which case there is one;
 none for groups of type Bn or Cn, unless n = s(s+1) for some s, in which case there is one (called θ10 when n = 2);
 2 for Suzuki groups of type 2B2;
 none for groups of type Dn, unless n = s2 for some even s, in which case there is one;
 none for groups of type 2Dn, unless n = s2 for some odd s, in which case there is one;
 2 for groups of type 3D4;
 2 for groups of type E6;
 3 for groups of type 2E6;
 2 for groups of type E7;
 13 for groups of type E8;
 7 for groups of type F4;
 10 for Ree groups of type 2F4;
 4 for groups of type G2;
 6 for Ree groups of type 2G2.
The unipotent characters can be found by decomposing the characters induced from the cuspidal ones, using results of Howlett and Lehrer. The number of unipotent characters depends only on the root system of the group and not on the field (or the center). The dimension of the unipotent characters can be given by universal polynomials in the order of the ground field depending only on the root system; for example the Steinberg representation has dimension qr, where r is the number of positive roots of the root system.

Lusztig discovered that the unipotent characters of a group GF (with irreducible Weyl group) fall into families of size  4n (n ≥ 0), 8, 21, or 39. The characters of each family are indexed by conjugacy classes of pairs (x,σ) where x is in one of the groups  Z/2Zn, S3, S4, S5 respectively, and σ is a representation of its centralizer. (The family of size 39 only occurs for groups of type E8, and the family of size 21 only occurs for groups of type F4.) The families are in turn indexed by special representations of the Weyl group, or equivalently by 2-sided cells of the Weyl group.
For example, the group E8(Fq) has 46 families of unipotent characters corresponding to the 46 special representations of the Weyl group of E8. There are 23 families with 1 character, 18 families with 4 characters, 4 families with 8 characters, and one family with 39 characters (which includes the 13 cuspidal unipotent characters).

Examples
Suppose that q is an odd prime power, and G is the algebraic group SL2.
We describe the Deligne–Lusztig representations of the group SL2(Fq). (The representation theory of these groups was well known long before Deligne–Lusztig theory.)

The irreducible representations are:
 The trivial representation of dimension 1.
 The Steinberg representation  of dimension q
 The (q − 3)/2 irreducible principal series representations of dimension q + 1, together with 2 representations of dimension (q + 1)/2 coming from a reducible principal series representation.
 The (q − 1)/2 irreducible discrete series representations of dimension q − 1, together with 2 representations of dimension (q − 1)/2 coming from a reducible discrete series representation.

There are two classes of tori associated to the two elements (or conjugacy classes) of the
Weyl group, denoted by T(1) (cyclic of order q−1) and T(w) (cyclic of order q + 1). The non-trivial element of the  Weyl group acts on the characters of these tori by changing each character to its inverse. So the Weyl group fixes a character if and only if it has order 1 or 2. By the orthogonality formula,
Rθ(w) is (up to sign) irreducible if θ does not have order 1 or 2, and a sum of two irreducible representations if it has order 1 or 2.

The Deligne-Lusztig variety X(1) for the split torus is 0-dimensional with q+1 points, and can be identified with the points of 1-dimensional projective space defined over Fq.
The representations Rθ(1) are given as follows:
 1+Steinberg if θ=1
 The sum of the 2 representations of dimension (q+1)/2 if θ has order 2.
 An irreducible principal series    representation if θ has order greater than 2.

The Deligne-Lusztig variety X(w) for the non-split torus is 1-dimensional, and can be identified with the complement of X(1) in 1-dimensional projective space. So it is the set of points (x:y) of projective space not fixed by the Frobenius map (x:y)→ (xq:yq), in other words the points with

Drinfeld's variety of points (x,y) of affine space with

maps to X(w) in the obvious way, and is acted on freely by the group of q+1th roots
λ of 1 (which can be identified with the elements of the non-split torus that are defined over Fq), with λ taking (x,y) to (λx,λy). The Deligne Lusztig variety is the quotient of Drinfeld's variety by this group action.
The representations −Rθ(w) are given  as follows:
 Steinberg−1 if θ=1
 The sum of the 2 representations of dimension (q−1)/2 if θ has order 2.
 An irreducible discrete series representation if θ has order greater than 2.

The unipotent representations are the trivial representation and the Steinberg representation, and the semisimple  representations are all the representations other than the Steinberg representation. (In this case the semisimple representations do not correspond exactly to geometric conjugacy classes of the dual group, as the center of G is not connected.)

Intersection cohomology and character sheaves

 replaced the ℓ-adic cohomology used to define the Deligne-Lusztig representations with intersection ℓ-adic cohomology, and introduced certain perverse sheaves called character sheaves. The representations defined using intersection cohomology are related to those defined using ordinary cohomology by Kazhdan–Lusztig polynomials. The F-invariant irreducible character sheaves are  closely related to the irreducible characters of the group GF.

References
 .
 
 
 
 
 
 .
 
 
 
 
 ; ; ; ; 
 

Finite groups
Representation theory